The Testimony of Taliesin Jones is a 2000 British drama film directed by Martin Duffy and starring John Paul Macleod and Jonathan Pryce. It is based on the 1996 novel of the same name by Rhidian Brook.

Cast 
 John Paul Macleod – Taliesin Jones 
 Jonathan Pryce – Tal's Dad
 Geraldine James – Tal's Mum
 Matthew Rhys – Jonathan
 Robert Pugh – Handycott

References

External links 

2000 drama films
2000 films
Films based on British novels
British drama films
2000s English-language films
2000s British films